Dying to Survive is a 2018 Chinese comedy-drama film directed by Wen Muye in his feature film debut. The film is based on the real-life story of Lu Yong (陆勇), a Chinese leukemia patient who smuggled cheap and generic cancer medicine from India for 1,000 Chinese cancer sufferers in 2004. Dying to Survive stars Xu Zheng in the lead role, who also co-produced the film with Ning Hao.

Plot
An aphrodisiac peddler, Cheng Yong, is in financial trouble. His store has not been making profits for a long time and his father urgently needs a large sum of money for brain surgery.

One day a man wearing thick layers of surgical masks comes to his shop. He asks Cheng to bring a cheap drug from India in return for a large sum of money. Due to patent protection, the Swiss drug imatinib is very expensive and cannot be afforded by most leukemia patients in China. However, an inexpensive generic version of it is available in India.

Desperate for money, Cheng agrees to risk smuggling the drug into China. As more chronic myelogenous leukemia patients start to buy drugs from him, Cheng becomes rich. His motivation starts to change after he witnesses devastated patients whose families had been pushed into poverty by costly cancer treatments walk away with hope for the future.

At the same time, Chinese police notice the availability of the contraband Geliening and vow to crack down on the unlicensed generic drug, as the originator company Nuo Wa (reflecting Novartis in real life) sued the Indian government for infringing its patent.

Cast
Xu Zheng as Cheng Yong
Tan Zhuo as Liu Sihui
Wang Chuanjun as Lü Shouyi
Wang Yanhui as Zhang Changlin
Zhang Yu as Peng Hao
Zhou Yiwei as Cao Bin
Yang Xinmin as Pastor Liu
Gong Beibi as Cao Ling, Cheng Yong's ex-wife and Cao Bin's elder sister
Keith Shillitoe
Jia Chenfei
Li Naiwen 
Wang Jiajia as Lü Shouyi's wife
Ning Hao
Shahbaz Khan
Nishith Avinash Shah as Translator

Box office
On opening day, the film topped the Chinese box office and grossed , including preview screenings. By the end of its opening weekend, the film had grossed , the fourth biggest opening weekend ever in China. As of September 15, 2018, the film has grossed , becoming the year's third highest-grossing film at the Chinese box office.

Critical reception
Pang-Chieh Ho of SupChina wrote that Dying to Survive "might be China's best movie of the year". She compared the film's social realist themes to Hollywood film Dallas Buyers Club, Indian film Dangal, and Chinese film Angels Wear White. Though Simon Abrams of RogerEbert.com also compared the film to Dallas Buyers Club, he gave Dying to Survive two out of four stars, criticizing the excessive focus on Cheng to the detriment of the film's message and at the expense of other characters. He stated that "I’d have an easier time accepting the trite, asked-and-answered conclusions... if [the director and co-writers] were more adept at tugging at viewers' heart-strings."

Impact
The film sparked debate about the cost of healthcare in China. Chinese Premier Li Keqiang cited the film in an appeal to regulators to "speed up price cuts for cancer drugs" and "reduce the burden on families".

Accolades

References

External links

2018 films
2018 comedy-drama films
Chinese comedy-drama films
Films about cancer
Films about drugs
Films set in Mumbai
Films set in Shanghai
Films shot in Mumbai
Films shot in Shanghai
Films about real people